Puthur is a residential area in the city of Palakkad, in the Palakkad district in the state of Kerala, India. Puthur is wards 12 and 13 of Palakkad Municipality.

The central attraction of Puthur is Thirupuraikkal Bhagavathy temple.This temple houses the Goddess Karnaki, who is believed to be an incarnation of Goddess Parvathi. This temple is famous locally and attracts thousands of devotees every year to the Puthur-Vela festival.

Transportation
Puthur is connected to other cities through Palakkad by a bypass road probably known as Calicut bypass road, which was constructed to bypass Palakkad city for the passengers coming from parts of northern Kerala.Palakkad Junction railway station is the nearest major railway station. Calicut International Airport, Cochin International Airport and Coimbatore Airport  are the nearest airports.

References

External links 

www.puthurtemple.org

 
Suburbs of Palakkad
Cities and towns in Palakkad district